"Humpty Dumpty" is the third episode of the second season of House, which premiered on Fox on September 27, 2005. Dr. Lisa Cuddy's longtime handyman Alfredo falls off her roof, causing breathing problems.

Plot
After falling off the roof of Cuddy's house, handyman Alfredo begins to have difficulty breathing, and his fingers turn purple. House suggests DIC.

Cameron finds Alfredo's blood is not clotting, indicating minor DIC, and Cuddy shocks the staff by ordering Protein C. Alfredo becomes unable to move his arm and Chase tells Cuddy the protein C caused bleeding in Alfredo's brain. The treatment is stopped, and Alfredo is rushed into neurosurgery. As Cameron examines him, Alfredo suffers a coughing fit; a chest X-ray shows lung infiltration, and Foreman suggests pneumonia. Chase mentions that Alfredo has a low titer for chlamydia antibodies, but is dismissed by Foreman because the chest X-rays do not match chlamydial pneumonia.

House takes Alfredo's temperature and sees his hand is rotting, but Cuddy – anxious to save Alfredo’s livelihood – refuses to allow amputation, but is persuaded by House, who begs Stacy for legal clearance. During surgery, Alfredo’s other hand begins to turn purple. House proposes endocarditis, but Cuddy points out that Alfredo tested negative for endocarditis. House puts forward psittacosis, but Chase objects that Alfredo does not have pet parrots. House barges into Alfredo's room and interrogates his mother, in perfect Spanish; House realizes that Alfredo works cockfights.

Cuddy and Foreman find a cockfight in the warehouse district and find Alfredo's brother Manny carrying cages of dead birds, confirming House's diagnosis. Cuddy calls House, who has already begun treatment for psittacosis. Alfredo and his family decide to sue the hospital for the loss of his hand, which Cuddy is sure the hospital will settle.

External links

 "Humpty Dumpty" at Fox.com
 

House (season 2) episodes
2005 American television episodes
Television episodes directed by Dan Attias

fr:Culpabilité (Dr House)